Sam van 't Westende (born 6 August 1991) is a Dutch judoka.

He is the bronze medallist of the 2018 Judo Grand Prix Tbilisi in the -73 kg category.

References

External links
 

1991 births
Living people
Dutch male judoka
20th-century Dutch people
21st-century Dutch people